
Gmina Mikstat is an urban-rural gmina (administrative district) in Ostrzeszów County, Greater Poland Voivodeship, in west-central Poland.

Villages
Apart from the town of Mikstat, Gmina Mikstat contains the villages and settlements of Biskupice Zabaryczne, Kaliszkowice Ołobockie, Komorów, Kotłów, Mikstat-Pustkowie and Przedborów.

Neighbouring gminas
Gmina Mikstat is bordered by the gminas of Grabów nad Prosną, Ostrzeszów, Przygodzice and Sieroszewice.

References
Polish official population figures 2006

Mikstat
Ostrzeszów County